Joseph Stanley Need (22 February 1819 – 25 August 1892) was an English first-class cricketer active 1841–55 who played for Nottinghamshire. He was born in Nottingham and died in Dunkirk, Nottinghamshire. He played in two first-class matches.

References

1819 births
1892 deaths
English cricketers
Nottinghamshire cricketers